The Liberia national under-20 football team represents Liberia at under-20 youth international matches. They competed in the 2018 WAFU/FOX U-20 Tournament, with Christopher Wreh as manager.

References

under-20
Liberia